York Township is one of fifteen townships in Clark County, Illinois, USA.  As of the 2010 census, its population was 551 and it contained 270 housing units.

Geography

Unincorporated towns
 Walnut Prairie
 West Union
 York
(This list is based on USGS data and may include former settlements.)

Cemeteries
The township contains these five cemeteries: Harrison, Hogue, Shawler, Walnut Prairie and York.

Major highways
  Illinois Route 1

Rivers
 Wabash River

Landmarks
 West Union Park

Demographics

School districts
 Hutsonville Community Unit School District 1
 Marshall Community Unit School District 2c

Political districts
 Illinois' 15th congressional district
 State House District 109
 State Senate District 55

References

 United States Census Bureau 2007 TIGER/Line Shapefiles
 United States National Atlas

External links
 City-Data.com
 Illinois State Archives

Townships in Clark County, Illinois
Townships in Illinois